Vuelo secreto is a Colombian sitcom, created by Juan Manuel Cáceres and broadcast weekly between 1992 and 1999. Set in a travel agency, it initially focused on the relationship between Ernesto, the boss, and two of his employees, Alejandro and Pilar (who kept their marriage secret, as the company forbade relationships between employees).

Cast
Armando Gutiérrez as Alejandro Martínez
Adriana Vera as Pilar Rojas
Carlos Barbosa as Ernesto Suárez Vergara (manager of Viajes Lunaire)
Ana María Arango as María Elvira
Ana Bolena Mesa as Liliana Charry
Ramiro Meneses as Oswaldo
Fabio Rubiano as Daniel aka el Triplepapito
Luigi Aycardi as Santiago
Jessica Rodríguez as Yuri Jessica Cucalón
María Elvira Arango as Martha Linares
Claudia de Hoyos as Claudia Bustos
Ana Cristina Botero as Silvia
Evelyn Santos as Paloma
Alberto Saavedra as Francisco Pombo
Daniel Rocha as Richardo
Martín Armenta as El Costeño

Broadcast
Vuelo secreto was broadcast on Sunday evenings between early 1992 and late 1997, earning good ratings. In 1998, it moved to Fridays. The last episode was broadcast on Wednesday 24 February 1999. Caracol TV reran some episodes in the early 2000s (decade) on weekday mornings.

Soundtrack
The theme song for Vuelo secreto was Magneto's Vuela, vuela.

References

External links

Colombian television sitcoms
1992 Colombian television series debuts
1999 Colombian television series endings
1990s Colombian television series